Ranunculus trilobus, the threelobe buttercup, is a species of annual herb in the family Ranunculaceae.

Sources

References 

trilobus
Flora of Malta